The Street at Chestnut Hill is an open-air shopping center on Route 9 in Chestnut Hill, Massachusetts. The shopping center contains  of fashion retailers, restaurants, and entertainment options. The architecture and design of the new shopping center mimics modern village-like streetscapes and overlooks neighboring Hammond Pond. The center contains a Showcase SuperLux and a Star Market.

History 
In 1950, a development team from C&R Management, headed by Daniel Rothenberg and Julien Cohen, built a shopping center in Chestnut Hill,  from Boston. Chestnut Hill Shopping Center began with a variety of shops, such as Filene's, Franklin Simon & Co., and London Harness Company, adjacent to a Star Market at the intersection of Route 9 and Hammond Street. On July 27, R.H. Stearns and S.S. Pierce opened in a separate building. In 1978, the Chestnut Hill Medical Center and Bloomingdale's opened in The Shops at Chestnut Hill.

References

External links 
The Street Official Website

Chestnut Hill, Massachusetts
Shopping malls in Massachusetts
Shopping malls established in 2012